Claus Ogerman (born Klaus Ogermann; 29 April 1930 – 8 March 2016) was a German arranger, conductor, and composer best known for his work with Billie Holiday, Antonio Carlos Jobim, Frank Sinatra, Michael Brecker, and Diana Krall.

Life and work
Born in Ratibor (Racibórz), Upper Silesia, Germany (now part of Poland), Ogerman began his career with the piano. He was one of the most prolific 20th century arrangers and has worked in the top 40, rock, pop, jazz, R&B, soul, easy listening, Broadway and classical music fields. The exact number of recording artists for whom Ogerman has either arranged or conducted during his career has never been determined.

In the 1950s, Ogerman worked in Germany as an arranger-pianist with Kurt Edelhagen, saxophonist and bandleader Max Greger, and Delle Haensch. Claus (then Klaus) also worked as a part-time vocalist and recorded several 45 rpm singles under the pen name of "Tom Collins", duetting with Hannelore Cremer; he also recorded a solo vocal with the Delle Haensch Jump Combo.

In 1959, Ogerman moved to the United States and joined the producer Creed Taylor at Verve Records, working on recordings with many artists, including Antonio Carlos Jobim, Bill Evans, Wes Montgomery, Kai Winding, and Cal Tjader. Verve was sold to MGM in 1963. Ogerman, by his own reckoning in Gene Lees' Jazzletter publication, arranged some 60-70 albums for Verve under Creed Taylor's direction from 1963 to 1967.

During this time he also arranged many pop hits, including Solomon Burke's "Cry To Me", and Lesley Gore's "It's My Party", "Judy's Turn to Cry", "She's a Fool", and "Maybe I Know". In 1966, Ogerman arranged and conducted Bill Evans Trio with Symphony Orchestra (Verve Records). In 1967, he joined Creed Taylor on the A&M/CTi label. Ogerman charted under his own name in 1965. The RCA single "Watusi Trumpets" reached #130 in the Music Vendor charts.

Ogerman arranged and conducted  Diana Krall's 2001 album The Look of Love, and conducted parts of her Live in Paris performance recorded on DVD. He also served as arranger and conductor for Krall's 2009 album Quiet Nights.

Ogerman won the 1980 Grammy Award for Best Instrumental Arrangement for George Benson's "Soulful Strut" and the 2010 Grammy Award for Best Instrumental Arrangement Accompanying Vocalist(s) for "Quiet Nights". He arranged and conducted the orchestra on George Benson's 1976 album, Breezin', as well as on two other Benson albums. Among Ogerman's most remarkable albums are: Gate Of Dreams (WB, 1977), from the music of the ballet Some Times; Cityscape with Michael Brecker (Warner/Pioneer, 1982); and Claus Ogerman Featuring Michael Brecker (GRP, 1991), all of which include original compositions centered on the juxtaposition of jazz instruments and rhythm sections with classical music orchestra.

Classical compositions
From the 1970s, Ogerman devoted himself almost exclusively to composing. His commissions included a ballet score for the American Ballet Theatre, Some Times; a work for Bill Evans for jazz piano and orchestra, Symbiosis; a work for Michael Brecker for saxophone and orchestra, Cityscape; a song cycle, Tagore-Lieder, after poems by Rabindranath Tagore, recorded by Judith Blegen and Brigitte Fassbaender; a concerto for violin and orchestra, Lirico, and a Sarabande-Fantasie for violin and orchestra, recorded by Aaron Rosand; 10 Songs for Chorus A-Capella After Poems by Georg Heym, recorded by the Cologne Radio Chorus; and a work for violin and orchestra, Preludio and Chant, recorded by Gidon Kremer. His works for violin and piano were recorded on a 2007 disc by the Chinese violinist Yue Deng and French pianist Jean-Yves Thibaudet. In July 2008, Ogerman released an album of compositions with jazz pianist Danilo Perez, Across the Crystal Sea.

Ogerman's major influences as a composer were Max Reger and Alexander Scriabin. He steadfastly maintained that he was not primarily concerned with "modernism" per se, stating that his goal was to evoke an emotional response in the listener.

Work with Antonio Carlos Jobim

Ogerman arranged and conducted Francis Albert Sinatra & Antonio Carlos Jobim (1967), the first of two recordings that Frank Sinatra made with Antonio Carlos Jobim. Ogerman also arranged and conducted Jobim's The Composer of Desafinado, Plays (1963), A Certain Mr. Jobim (1967), Wave (1967), Jobim (1972), Urubu (1976), and Terra Brasilis (1980), on which he also played the piano. Ogerman also produced the Jobim and Urubu albums.

Filmography as composer
 The Old Forester House (1956)
 Weißer Holunder (1957)
 Eine verrückte Familie (1957)
 Liebe, wie die Frau sie wünscht (1957)
 I Was All His (1957)
 Die Unschuld vom Lande (1957)
 Die Prinzessin von St. Wolfgang (1957)
 Seine Hoheit war ein Mädchen (1958)
 Rivalen der Manege (1958)
 All the Sins of the Earth (1958)
 Love, Girls and Soldiers (1958)
  (1958)
 $100 a Night (1959)
 Girls for the Mambo-Bar (1959)
 A Summer You Will Never Forget (1959)
 The Bellboy and the Playgirls (1962)
 Looking for Love (1964)

Discography
Music From The Roaring 20's (United Artists, 1961)
Jeder Singt Mit! (United Artists, 1962) – as Klaus Ogermann
Soul Searchin'  (RCA Victor, 1965)
Watusi Trumpets  (RCA Victor, 1965)
Saxes Mexicanos (RCA Victor, 1966)
Latin Rock (RCA Victor, 1967)
Gate of Dreams (Warner Bros., 1977)
Aranjuez (CBS, 1978) with Jan Akkerman
Cityscape (Warner Bros., 1982) with Michael Brecker
Preludio & Chant, Elegia, Symphonic Dances (EMI, 1982) with Gidon Kremer and the London Symphony Orchestra 
Claus Ogerman featuring Michael Brecker (GRP, 1991) with Michael Brecker
Symphonic Dances / Some Times (Ballet) (Bay City, 1992) with the  New York Studio Symphony Orchestra
Lyrical Works (EMI, 1997)
Two Concertos (Decca, 2001)
Works for Violin & Piano (Decca, 2007) featuring Yue Deng (violin) and Jean-Yves Thibaudet (piano)

Compilations
The Man Behind the Music (Boutique, 2002) - 4CD featuring various artists

as arranger/conductor

With George Benson
Breezin' (Warner Bros., 1976)
In Flight (Warner Bros., 1977)
Livin' Inside Your Love (Warner Bros., 1979)
With Solomon Burke
"Cry to Me" (Atlantic, 1962)
With Donald Byrd
Up with Donald Byrd (Verve, 1965)
With Betty Carter
'Round Midnight (Atco, 1963)
With Sammy Davis Jr.
The Nat King Cole Songbook (Reprise, 1965)
Sammy's Back on Broadway (Reprise, 1965)
With Bill Evans
Plays the Theme from The V.I.P.s and Other Great Songs (MGM, 1963)
Bill Evans Trio with Symphony Orchestra (Verve, 1965)
Symbiosis (MPS, 1974) - composed by Ogerman
With Connie Francis
"In the Summer of His Years" (MGM, 1963)
Connie Francis Sings Bacharach & David (MGM, 1968 - and producer)
With Michael Franks
Sleeping Gypsy (Warner Bros., 1977)
With Stan Getz
Reflections (Verve, 1963)
Voices (Verve, 1967)
What the World Needs Now: Stan Getz Plays Burt Bacharach and Hal David (Verve, 1968)
With Astrud Gilberto
The Shadow of Your Smile (Verve, 1965))
With João Gilberto
Amoroso (Warner Bros., 1977)
With João Donato
The New Sound of Brazil: Piano of João Donato (RCA Victor, 1965)
With Lesley Gore
I'll Cry If I Want To (Mercury, 1963)
"Maybe I Know" (Mercury, 1964)
"Look of Love" (Mercury, 1964)
With Stephane Grappelli
Uptown Dance (CBS, 1978)
With Al Hirt
That Honey Horn Sound (RCA Victor, 1965)
With Billie Holiday
Lady in Satin (Columbia, 1958)
With Johnny Hodges
Sandy's Gone (Verve, 1963)
With Freddie Hubbard
The Love Connection (Columbia, 1979) - and producer
With Willis Jackson
'Gator Tails (Verve, 1964)
With Antônio Carlos Jobim
The Composer of Desafinado Plays (Verve, 1963)
A Certain Mr. Jobim (Warner Bros., 1967)
Wave (A&M, 1967))
Jobim (MCA, 1973) - and producer
Urubu (Warner Bros., 1976) - and producer
Terra Brasilis (Warner Bros., 1980) - and piano
With Dr. John
City Lights (Horizon, 1978)
With Wynton Kelly
Comin' in the Back Door (Verve, 1963)
With Ben E. King
Ben E. King Sings for Soulful Lovers (Atco, 1962)
Don't Play That Song! (Atco, 1962)
With Diana Krall
The Look of Love (Verve, 2001)
Quiet Nights (Verve, 2009)
With Wes Montgomery
Tequila (Verve, 1966)
Willow Weep for Me (Verve, 1969)
With Danilo Perez
Across the Crystal Sea (EmArcy, 2008)
With Oscar Peterson
Motions and Emotions (MPS, 1969) - and producer
With Frank Sinatra
Francis Albert Sinatra & Antonio Carlos Jobim (Reprise, 1967) with Antônio Carlos Jobim
The World We Knew (Reprise, 1967)
With Jimmy Smith
Any Number Can Win (Verve, 1963)
Who's Afraid of Virginia Woolf? (Verve, 1964))
With Barbra Streisand
Stoney End (Columbia, 1971)
Classical Barbra (Columbia, 1973 [1976]) - conductor and producer
With Cal Tjader
Warm Wave (Verve, 1964)
With Mel Tormé 
"Comin' Home Baby" (Atlantic, 1962)
With Stanley Turrentine
Nightwings (Fantasy, 1977)
West Side Highway (Fantasy, 1978)
With Kai Winding
Soul Surfin' (Verve, 1963)
Kai Winding (Verve, 1963)
Mondo Cane #2 (Verve, 1964)

See also 
 List of music arrangers
 List of jazz arrangers

References

External links
 Marc Myers: Claus Ogerman (1930-2016), JazzWax. 2017-10-17.
 Barbara J. Major: The Work of Claus Ogerman (biography, discography), 2014–2016.
 
 

1930 births
2016 deaths
20th-century German composers
20th-century German conductors (music)
20th-century German male musicians
21st-century German composers
21st-century German conductors (music)
21st-century German male musicians
Ballet composers
German emigrants to the United States
German male conductors (music)
German male composers
German music arrangers
Grammy Award winners
Jazz arrangers
Male jazz musicians
People from Racibórz
People from the Province of Upper Silesia
RCA Victor artists